Catheys Creek is a stream in the U.S. state of North Carolina, and is a tributary of the Second Broad River. It is located in central Rutherford County and originates in an area north of Rutherfordton near the county line with McDowell county. The stream flows southeast until it reaches and joins with the Second Broad River.

History 
Catheys Creek was named for George Cathey, a revolutionary war soldier who owned roughly 300 acres along the creek. The first postmaster at Catheys Creek was Benjamin Wilson, serving from 1826 to 1837 when the river was a part of Buncombe County. After him, James Hamblen served as postmaster until its closing in 1861, after the establishment of Transylvania County.

References 

Rivers of North Carolina
Rivers of Rutherford County, North Carolina